Lipstick on the Mirror is the debut studio album by American rock band Pop Evil that was released on August 12, 2008 by Pazzo Music and later re-released by Universal Republic on May 26, 2009. All the songs on their album were written by the entire band.

Track listing

Band members
 Leigh Kakaty – lead vocals
 Dylan Allison – drums
 Dave Grahs – rhythm guitar, backing vocals
 Tony Greve – lead guitar
 Matt DiRito – bass, backing vocals

Charts

References

2008 debut albums
Pop Evil albums
Universal Republic Records albums